Münster is a municipality in the Kufstein district in the Austrian state of Tyrol located 20 km west of Wörgl and 34 km southwest of Kufstein. It is the westernmost community of the district and lies at the northern side of the Inn River. The main sources of income are tourism, agriculture and a bottling factory for mineral water.

References

External links
 Official website

Cities and towns in Kufstein District